National Cycle Route 22 (NCR22) runs from Banstead to Brockenhurst in the New Forest via Dorking, Guildford, Farnham, Petersfield, Havant, Portsmouth, Ryde, Yarmouth and Lymington. Due to the route going over the Isle of Wight, ferry connections are required from Portsmouth to Ryde, and again from Yarmouth to Lymington.

Route

Banstead to Dorking
Banstead | Redhill | Dorking

Dorking to Guildford
Dorking | Guildford

Guildford to Farnham
Guildford | Farnham

There is a busy one-way system in central Guildford, which takes the route over the River Wey. The route passes some small statues commemorating Lewis Carroll, a son of Guildford, as it goes over the River Wey. The statues are down on the west bank of the river, and are very small. 

The route soon goes onto a quieter road (Grid reference SU993493), with a steep uphill which goes past the burial place of Lewis Carroll. Guildford has a statue for Through the Looking-Glass in a small garden to the east of Guildford Castle.

About 1 km out of Guildford, the route moves onto a Bridleway at Henley Fort, then touches the A31 briefly before heading south. The route passes near Watts Gallery, where there are some tea rooms, and then heads west through Puttenham. One can follow the B3000 to this point, or use a bridleway. At Puttenham, there are some opportunities for refreshment in the form of two pubs, one is a Harvester. 

From Puttenham, the route follows Seale Lane, which runs just south of the Hogs Back (the A31). The road undulates. The road passes through Seale, where there is a craft centre. At SU895479, one take go northwest toward the Hogs Back Brewery (1 km) or continue directly west. The northern road has a steeper climb but bends west and within 2 km rejoins the road to Farnham at Runfold Manor. 

West of Runfold, the road joins the A31 - which is a dual carriageway, the route therefore diverts south to cross the River Wey at SU861466 and go through Compton, and hence into Farnham.

Farnham to Petersfield
Farnham | Liss | Petersfield

Petersfield to Portsmouth
Petersfield | Havant | Portsmouth

Ryde to Yarmouth
Ryde | Newport | Yarmouth

Lymington to Brockenhurst
Lymington | The New Forest | Brockenhurst

References

Transport in Hampshire
Transport on the Isle of Wight